Forward is The Abyssinians' third album, released in 1982 (see 1982 in music).

Track listing
"Forward Jah" - 3:28
"Prophesy" - 3:24
"This Is Not the End" - 6:14
"Satta Massagana" (Collins, Manning, Manning) - 3:26
"Mabrak" - 3:51
"Forward Onto Zion" - 3:49
"Praise Him" - 3:30
"Peculiar Number" (Manning) - 3:48
"Peculiar Dub" (Manning) - 4:43
"Jerusalem" - 2:20

Personnel
Bernard Collins - vocals
Donald Manning - vocals
Lynford Manning - vocals
Richard Ace - Keyboards
Headley Bennett - Alto Saxophone
Pablove Black - Keyboards
Fred Breitberg - Engineer
Tony Chin - Guitar
Donna Cline - Design
Glen DeCosta - Flute
Bobby Ellis - Trumpet
Eric Frater - Guitar
"Dirty" Harry Hall - Tenor Saxophone
Bongo Herman - Percussion
Clive "Azul" Hunt - Arranger
Jah Jerry Haynes - Guitar
Janhor Mwangi JaJa - Photography
Don D Junior - Trombone
Eric "Bingy Bunny" Lamont - Guitar
Wire Lindo - Keyboards
Robert Lyn - Keyboards
Carlton Manning - Guitar
Herman Marquis - Alto Saxophone
David Martin - Trumpet
Sylvan Morris - Engineer
Ozzie - Keyboards
Lloyd Parks - Bass
Devon Richardson - Drums
Carlton "Santa" Davis - Drums
Eric Schilling - Post Production
Robbie Shakespeare - Bass, Guitar
Leroy Sibbles - Bass
Zoot "Skully" Simms - Percussion
Earl "Chinna" Smith - Guitar
Ruddy Thomas - Percussion
Errol Thompson - Engineer
Leroy "Horsemouth" Wallace - Drums
Franklyn Waul - Keyboards

References

External links
TheAbyssinians.com discography page

1982 albums
The Abyssinians albums
Alligator Records albums